A machair (sometimes machar in English) is a fertile low-lying grassy plain found on part of the northwest coastlines of Ireland and Scotland, in particular the Outer Hebrides. The best examples are found on North and South Uist, Harris and Lewis.

Etymology
Machair is a Gaelic word meaning "fertile plain", but the word is now also used in scientific literature to describe the dune grassland unique to Western Scotland and north-west Ireland. It had been used by naturalists since 1926, but the term was not adopted by scientists until the 1940s. The word is used in a number of placenames in Ireland and Scotland, even in areas where no machair has ever been supported. In Scotland, some Gaelic speakers use machair as a general term for the whole dune system, including the dune ridge, while others restrict its use to the extensive flat grasslands inland of the dune ridge. In Ireland, the word has been used only in place-names, and the habitat's existence there was only
recently confirmed.

In 1976, an effort was made to strictly define machair, although a number of systems still evade classification. This proved difficult when the habitat was listed on Annex I of the Habitats Directive in 1992, leading to the distinction between "machair grassland" and the "machair system".

Geography

Machair is distinguished from the links on the east coast of Scotland by a lower mineral content, whereas the links are high in silica. Machair plains are highly calcareous, with calcium carbonate concentrations of between 20% to 80% on the beaches, and decreasing further away from the shore. The pH of a machair is typically greater than 7, i.e. it is alkaline.

The inner side of a machair is often wet or marshy, and may contain lochs.

Formation
The modern theory of machair formation was first set out by William MacGillivray in 1830. He worked out that shell fragments are rolled by waves towards the shore, where they are broken up further. The small shell fragments are blown up the beach to form hillocks, which are then blown inland.

Humans
Human activity has an important role in the creation of the machair. Archaeological evidence indicates that some trees had been cleared for agriculture by around 6000 BC, but there was still some woodland on the coast of South Uist as late as 1549. Seaweed deposited by early farmers provided a protective cover and added nutrients to the soil. The grass is kept short by cattle and sheep, which also add trample and add texture to the sward, forming tussocks that favour a number of bird species.

The soil is low in a number of key nutrients, including trace elements such as copper, cobalt and manganese, which makes it necessary to feed cattle supplements or take them to summer pastures elsewhere. The sandy soil does not hold nutrients well, making artificial fertilisers ineffective and limiting the crops that can be grown to certain strains of oats and rye, and bere barley.

Ecology
Machairs have received considerable ecological and conservational attention, chiefly because of their unique ecosystems.

Sea
Kelp in the sea next to the machair softens the impact of waves, reducing erosion, and when it is washed ashore by storms, forms a protective barrier on the beach. As the kelp decays it provides home to local sand flies which in turn provide rich feeding for flocks of starlings and other passerines, wintering waders, gulls and others. If covered with sand, kelp will compost to form a fertile bed where annual coastal flowers and marram grass will thrive.

Flora

They can house rare carpet flowers, including orchids such as Irish lady's tresses and the Hebridean spotted orchid (Dactylorhiza fuchii ssp hebridensis) and other plants such as the yellow rattle.

Fauna
Bird species including the corn crake, twite, dunlin, common redshank and ringed plover, as well as rare insects such as the northern colletes bee, the great yellow bumblebee (Bombus distinguendus) and the moss carder bee (Bombus muscorum), are found there.

Threats
Arable and fallow machair is threatened by changes to the way the land is managed, where the original system of crofts is under threat from a reduction in the number of crofters and the use of "modern" techniques. Changes to the Common Agricultural Policy, where production was decoupled from subsidies, reduced the amount of grazing taking place in many crofting areas, and led some areas to be undergrazed or abandoned. A lack of native seed increases the need for fertilizers and herbicides.

Rising sea levels caused by global warming also pose a threat to low-lying coastal areas, leading to increased erosion. In January 1993, the storm which ran MV Braer aground off Shetland eroded  of machair along the entire length of Uist and Barra. On 11/12 January
2005, a storm blowing consistently in excess of hurricane force 12 destroyed hectares of machair.

References

Beaches of Ireland
Beaches of Scotland
Coastal and oceanic landforms
Coastal geography
Ecology of the British Isles
Grasslands